Jean Pierre Cáncar Maccari (born 8 July 1987 in Chanchamayo, Junín, Peru) is a Peruvian footballer who plays as a right back or a right sided midfielder. He currently plays for Cienciano in the Primera División Peruana.

Club career
Jean Pierre Cáncar started playing for his local club, Efugel, for the Copa Perú when he was only 14.

At 17, he was accepted into Sport Boys' youth divisions. In 2006, under Roberto Mosquera, he debuted with the first team in a match against Sporting Cristal.

In 2009, he was transferred to Sporting Cristal.

References

External links

1987 births
Living people
People from Junín Region
Peruvian footballers
Sport Boys footballers
Sporting Cristal footballers
Cienciano footballers
León de Huánuco footballers
Peruvian Primera División players
Copa Perú players
Peruvian Segunda División players
Association football fullbacks